Reykjavík is the capital and largest city of Iceland. It is located in southwestern Iceland, on the southern shore of Faxaflói bay. Its latitude is 64°08' N, making it the world's northernmost capital of a sovereign state. With a population of around 131,136 (and 233,034 in the Capital Region), it is the centre of Iceland's cultural, economic, and governmental activity, and is a popular tourist destination.

Reykjavík is believed to be the location of the first permanent settlement in Iceland, which, according to Landnámabók, was established by Ingólfr Arnarson in 874 CE. Until the 18th century, there was no urban development in the city location. The city was officially founded in 1786 as a trading town and grew steadily over the following decades, as it transformed into a regional and later national centre of commerce, population, and governmental activities. It is among the cleanest, greenest, and safest cities in the world.

History

According to legend, the first permanent Norse settlement in Iceland was established at Reykjavík by Ingólfr Arnarson around the year AD 870, as described in the Book of Settlement. Ingólfr is said to have decided the location of his settlement using a traditional Norse method: when land was in sight, he cast his high seat pillars overboard and promised to settle where the gods decided to bring them ashore. Two of his slaves then searched the coasts for three years before finding the pillars in the bay which eventually became the site of Reykjavík.

Etymology

The name is said to be inspired by steam rising from hot springs in the region. The original name was Reykjar-vík, with an "r" suffix for the genitive singular of reykr; the modern version reykja- uses the genitive plural. The name's meaning is still transparent in modern Icelandic. This form of the name fell out of use shortly after settlement, and the estate was referred to as Vík á Seltjarnarnesi until the name Reykjavík was revived when urban development began centuries later.

The name has been translated as Bay of Smoke in English language travel guides, or variations thereof, such as Smoky Bay, Smoke Cove, Steam Bay, etc.

Urban development

The site of the modern city centre was farmland until the 18th century. In 1752, King Frederik V of Denmark donated the estate of Reykjavík to the  corporation. In the 1750s, several houses were built to house the wool industry, which was Reykjavík's most important employer for a few decades and the original reason for its existence. Other industries were undertaken by the Innréttingar, such as fisheries, sulphur mining, agriculture, and shipbuilding.

The Danish Crown abolished monopoly trading in 1786 and granted six communities around the country an exclusive trading charter. Reykjavík was one of them and the only one to hold on to the charter permanently. 1786 is thus regarded as the date of the city's founding. Trading rights were limited to subjects of the Danish Crown, and Danish traders continued to dominate trade in Iceland. Over the following decades, their business in Iceland expanded. After 1880, free trade was expanded to all nationalities, and the influence of Icelandic merchants started to grow.

Rise of nationalism

Icelandic nationalist sentiment gained influence in the 19th century, and the idea of Icelandic independence became widespread. Reykjavík, as Iceland's only city, was central to such ideas. Advocates of an independent Iceland realized that a strong Reykjavík was fundamental to that objective. All the important events in the history of the independence struggle were important to Reykjavík as well. In 1845 Alþingi, the general assembly formed in 930 AD, was re-established in Reykjavík; it had been suspended a few decades earlier when it was located at Þingvellir. At the time it functioned only as an advisory assembly, advising the king about Icelandic affairs. The location of Alþingi in Reykjavík effectively established the city as the capital of Iceland.

In 1874, Iceland was given a constitution; with it, Alþingi gained some limited legislative powers and in essence became the institution that it is today. The next step was to move most of the executive power to Iceland: Home Rule was granted in 1904 when the office of Minister for Iceland was established in Reykjavík. The biggest step towards an independent Iceland was taken on 1 December 1918 when Iceland became a sovereign country under the Crown of Denmark, the Kingdom of Iceland.

By the 1920s and 1930s, most of the growing Icelandic fishing trawler fleet sailed from Reykjavík; cod production was its main industry, but the Great Depression hit Reykjavík hard with unemployment, and labour union struggles sometimes became violent.

World War II
On the morning of 10 May 1940, following the German occupation of Denmark and Norway on 9 April 1940, four British warships approached Reykjavík and anchored in the harbour. In a few hours, the allied occupation of Reykjavík was complete. There was no armed resistance, and taxi and truck drivers even assisted the invasion force, which initially had no motor vehicles. The Icelandic government had received many requests from the British government to consent to the occupation, but it always declined on the basis of the Neutrality Policy. For the remaining years of World War II, British and later American soldiers occupied camps in Reykjavík, and the number of foreign soldiers in Reykjavík became about the same as the local population of the city. The Royal Regiment of Canada formed part of the garrison in Iceland during the early part of the war.

The economic effects of the occupation were positive for Reykjavík: the unemployment of the Depression years vanished, and construction work began. The British built Reykjavík Airport, which remains in service today, mostly for short haul flights (to domestic destinations and Greenland). In 1944, the Republic of Iceland was founded and a president, elected by the people, replaced the king; the office of the president was placed in Reykjavík.

Post-war development
In the post-war years, the growth of Reykjavík accelerated. An exodus from the rural countryside began, largely because improved technology in agriculture reduced the need for manpower, and because of a population boom resulting from better living conditions in the country. A once-primitive village was rapidly transformed into a modern city. Private cars became common, and modern apartment complexes rose in the expanding suburbs.

In 1972, Reykjavík hosted the famous world chess championship between Bobby Fischer and Boris Spassky. The 1986 Reykjavík Summit between Ronald Reagan and Mikhail Gorbachev underlined Reykjavík's international status. Deregulation in the financial sector and the computer revolution of the 1990s again transformed Reykjavík. The financial and IT sectors are now significant employers in the city.

The city has fostered some world-famous musicians and artists in recent years, including musicians Björk and Ólafur Arnalds; bands Múm, Sigur Rós and Of Monsters and Men; writer Sjón; and visual artist Ragnar Kjartansson.

Geography

Reykjavík is located in the southwest of Iceland. The Reykjavík area coastline is characterized by peninsulas, coves, straits, and islands.

During the Ice Age (up to 10,000 years ago) a large glacier covered parts of the city area, reaching as far out as Álftanes. Other parts of the city area were covered by sea water. In the warm periods and at the end of the Ice Age, some hills like Öskjuhlíð were islands. The hills of Öskjuhlíð and Skólavörðuholt appear to be the remains of former shield volcanoes which were active during the warm periods of the Ice Age. After the Ice Age, the land rose as the heavy load of the glaciers fell away, and began to look as it does today.

The capital city area continued to be shaped by earthquakes and volcanic eruptions, like the one 4,500 years ago in the mountain range Bláfjöll, when the lava coming down the Elliðaá valley reached the sea at the bay of Elliðavogur.

The largest river to run through Reykjavík is the Elliðaá River, which is non-navigable. It offers salmon fishing within the city limits.

The city of Reykjavík is mostly located on the Seltjarnarnes peninsula, but the suburbs reach far out to the south and east. Reykjavík is a spread-out city: most of its urban area consists of low-density suburbs, and houses are usually widely spaced. The outer residential neighbourhoods are also widely spaced from each other; in between them are the main traffic arteries and a lot of empty space. The city's latitude is 64°08' N, making it the world's northernmost capital of a sovereign state (Nuuk, the capital of Greenland, is slightly further north at 64°10' (about 4 km) but Greenland is a constituent country, not an independent state).

Climate

Reykjavík has a subpolar oceanic climate (Köppen: Cfc) closely bordering on a continental subarctic climate (Köppen: Dfc) in the 0 °C isoterm. The city has had its present climate classification since the beginning of the 20th century.

At 64° north, Reykjavík is characterized by extremes of day and night length over the course of the year. From 20 May to 24 July, daylight is essentially permanent as the sun never gets more than 5° below the horizon. Day length drops to less than five hours between 2 December and 10 January. The sun climbs just 3° above the horizon during this time. However, day length begins increasing rapidly during January and by month's end there are seven hours of daylight.

Despite its northern latitude, temperatures very rarely drop below  in the winter. The proximity to the Arctic Circle and the strong moderation of the Atlantic Ocean in the Icelandic coast (influence of North Atlantic Current, an extension of the Gulf Stream) shape a relatively mild winter and cool summer. This is a result of exposure to the maritime winds in its exposed west coast location that causes it to be much cooler in summer than similar latitudes in mainland Scandinavia. Contrasting this, winter days are milder than anywhere in far southern Sweden and the vast majority of Denmark. Reykjavík averages 147 days of rain (more than 1 mm) per year. Droughts are uncommon, although they occur in some summers. July and August are the warmest months of the year on average and January and February the coldest.

In the summer of 2007, no rain was measured for one month. Summer tends to be the sunniest season, although May averages the most sunshine of any individual month. Overall, the city receives around 1,300 annual hours of sunshine, which is comparable with other places in northern and north-western Europe such as Ireland and Scotland, but substantially less than equally northern regions with a more continental climate, including the Bothnian Bay basin in Scandinavia. Nonetheless, Reykjavík is one of the cloudiest and coolest capitals of any nation in the world.

Cityscape

City administration
The Reykjavík City Council governs the city of Reykjavík and is directly elected by those aged over 18 domiciled in the city. The council has 23 members who are elected using the open list method for four-year terms.

The council selects members of boards, and each board controls a different field under the city council's authority. The most important board is the City Board that wields the executive rights along with the City Mayor. The City Mayor is the senior public official and also the director of city operations. Other public officials control city institutions under the mayor's authority. Thus, the administration consists of two different parts:
 The political power of City Council cascading down to other boards
 Public officials under the authority of the city mayor who administer and manage implementation of policy.

Political control
The Independence Party was historically the city's ruling party; it had an overall majority from its establishment in 1929 until 1978, when it narrowly lost. From 1978 until 1982, there was a three-party coalition composed of the People's Alliance, the Social Democratic Party, and the Progressive Party. In 1982, the Independence Party regained an overall majority, which it held for three consecutive terms. The 1994 election was won by Reykjavíkurlistinn (the R-list), an alliance of Icelandic socialist parties, led by Ingibjörg Sólrún Gísladóttir. This alliance won a majority in three consecutive elections, but was dissolved for the 2006 election when five different parties were on the ballot. The Independence Party won seven seats, and together with the one Progressive Party they were able to form a new majority in the council which took over in June 2006.

In October 2007 a new majority was formed on the council, consisting of members of the Progressive Party, the Social Democratic Alliance, the Left-Greens and the F-list (liberals and independents), after controversy regarding REI, a subsidiary of OR, the city's energy company. However, three months later the F-list formed a new majority together with the Independence Party. Ólafur F. Magnússon, the leader of the F-list, was elected mayor on 24 January 2008, and in March 2009 the Independence Party was due to appoint a new mayor. This changed once again on 14 August 2008 when the fourth coalition of the term was formed, by the Independence Party and the Social Democratic Alliance, with Hanna Birna Kristjánsdóttir becoming mayor.

The City Council election in May 2010 saw a new political party, The Best Party, win six of 15 seats, and they formed a coalition with the Social Democratic Alliance; comedian Jón Gnarr became mayor. At the 2014 election, the Social Democratic Alliance had its best showing yet, gaining five seats in the council, while Bright Future (successor to the Best Party) received two seats and the two parties formed a coalition with the Left-Green movement and the Pirate Party, which won one seat each. The Independence Party had its worst election ever, with only four seats.

Mayor

The mayor is appointed by the city council; usually one of the council members is chosen, but they may also appoint a mayor who is not a member of the council.

The post was created in 1907 and advertised in 1908. Two applications were received, from Páll Einarsson, sheriff and town mayor of Hafnarfjörður and from Knud Zimsen, town councillor in Reykjavík. Páll was appointed on 7 May and was mayor for six years. At that time the city mayor received a salary of 4,500 ISK per year and 1,500 ISK for office expenses. The current mayor is Dagur B. Eggertsson.

Demographics

Reykjavík is by far the largest and most populous settlement in Iceland. The municipality of Reykjavík had a population of 131,136 on 1 January 2020; that is 36% of the country's population. The Capital Region, which includes the capital and six municipalities around it, was home to 233,034 people; that is about 64% of the country's population.

On 1 January 2019, of the city's population of 128,793, immigrants of the first and second generation numbered 23,995 (18.6%), increasing from 12,352 (10.4%) in 2008 and 3,106 (2.9%) in 1998.
The most common foreign citizens are Poles, Lithuanians, and Latvians. About 80% of the city's foreign residents originate in European Union and EFTA member states, and over 58% are from the new member states of the EU, mainly former Eastern Bloc countries, which joined in 2004, 2007 and 2013.

Children of foreign origin form a more considerable minority in the city's schools: as many as a third in places. The city is also visited by thousands of tourists, students, and other temporary residents, at times outnumbering natives in the city centre.

Districts

Reykjavík is divided into 10 districts:
 Vesturbær (District 1)
 Miðborg (District 2, city centre)
 Hlíðar (District 3)
 Laugardalur (District 4)
 Háaleiti og Bústaðir (District 5)
 Breiðholt (District 6)
 Árbær (District 7)
 Grafarvogur (District 8)
 Kjalarnes (District 9) (in the north)
 Grafarholt og Úlfarsárdalur (District 10)

In addition there are hinterland areas (lightly shaded on the map) which are not assigned to any district.

Economy

Borgartún is the financial centre of Reykjavík, hosting a large number of companies and three investment banks.

Reykjavík has been at the centre of Iceland's economic growth and subsequent economic contraction over the 2000s, a period referred to in foreign media as the "Nordic Tiger" years, or "Iceland's Boom Years". The economic boom led to a sharp increase in construction, with large redevelopment projects such as Harpa concert hall and conference centre and others. Many of these projects came to a halt in the following economic crash of 2008.

Infrastructure

Roads
Per capita car ownership in Iceland is among the highest in the world at roughly 522 vehicles per 1,000 residents, though Reykjavík is not severely affected by congestion. Several multi-lane highways (mainly dual carriageways) run between the most heavily populated areas and most frequently driven routes. Parking spaces are also plentiful in most areas. Public transportation consists of a bus system called Strætó bs. Route 1 (the Ring Road) runs through the city outskirts and connects the city to the rest of Iceland.

Airports and seaports

Reykjavík Airport, the second largest airport in the country (after Keflavík International Airport), is positioned inside the city, just south of the city centre. It is mainly used for domestic flights, as well as flights to Greenland and the Faroe Islands. Since 1962, there has been some controversy regarding the location of the airport, since it takes up a lot of valuable space in central Reykjavík.

Reykjavík has two seaports, the old harbour near the city centre which is mainly used by fishermen and cruise ships, and Sundahöfn in the east city which is the largest cargo port in the country.

Railways

There are no public railways in Iceland, because of its sparse population, but the locomotives used to build the docks are on display. Proposals have been made for a high-speed rail link between the city and Keflavík.

District heating

Volcanic activity provides Reykjavík with geothermal heating systems for both residential and industrial districts. In 2008, natural hot water was used to heat roughly 90% of all buildings in Iceland. Of total annual use of geothermal energy of 39 PJ, space heating accounted for 48%.

Most of the district heating in Iceland comes from three main geothermal power plants:
 Svartsengi combined heat and power plant (CHP)
 Nesjavellir CHP plant
 Hellisheiði CHP plant

Cultural heritage
Safnahúsið (the Culture House) was opened in 1909 and has a number of important exhibits. Originally built to house the National Library and National Archives and also previously the location of the National Museum and Natural History Museum, in 2000 it was re-modeled to promote the Icelandic national heritage. Many of Iceland's national treasures are on display, such as the Poetic Edda, and the Sagas in their original manuscripts. There are also changing exhibitions of various topics.

Literary heritage
Reykjavík is the capital, and in fact Iceland’s only city, and as such, it plays a vital role in all cultural life in the country. The city is home to Iceland’s main cultural institutions, boasts a flourishing arts scene and is renowned as a creative city with a diverse range of cultural happenings and dynamic grassroots activities. Most of the country’s writers live in the city, and it also provides the setting for the majority of contemporary Icelandic literature – a development that has gone hand in hand with the rapid expansion of the city in the past 100 years or so.

Reykjavík is home to Icelandic medieval literature, including the Sagas of the Icelanders and the Poetic Edda, landmarks of world literature still widely read and translated today. This literary heritage is the core of the nation’s identity and narrative art is the single most important part of its cultural history. The Árni Magnússon Institute for Icelandic Studies in Reykjavík is the centre of this heritage. It preserves manuscripts, conducts research on them and publishes texts for the public, in addition to offering research facilities and tutoring to foreign scholars and students. The Arnamagnæan Manuscript Collection was added to the UNESCO Memory of the World Register on 31 July 2009. Reykjavík city was designated as a UNESCO City of Literature in 2011 and joined then the UNESCO Creatives Cities network.

Iceland is one of the smallest linguistic areas in the world, with only around 330,000 inhabitants and very few speakers outside the country. The language has not changed much since the time of settlement in the 9th century and modern Icelanders can still read the original medieval texts with relative ease. Literature plays a vital role in cherishing and cultivating the language, both original Icelandic literature and translations. Language undergoes constant renewal and development in fiction, and translation of foreign work has also been instrumental in conserving this thousand-year-old literary language.

Award-winning authors

Several Reykjavík writers have received international and Nordic awards. Halldór Laxness was awarded the Nobel Prize for Literature in 1955 for “vivid epic power which has renewed the great narrative art of Iceland”. The House of Halldór Laxness, Gljúfrasteinn, in the capital area can be visited year-round. A number of writers have won the Nordic Council’s Literature Prize, among them are Thor Vilhjálmsson, Einar Már Guðmundsson and Sjón, and authors such as Guðrún Helgadóttir, Kristín Steinsdóttir and Ragnheiður Gestsdóttir are winners of The Nordic Children’s Literature Prize. Crime writer Arnaldur Indriðason has won prizes abroad, including The Golden Dagger Award. Among other prizes awarded to writers from Reykjavík are the Kairos Preis (Andri Snaer Magnason), the Swedish Academy’s Nordic Literature Prize (Guðbergur Bergsson) and the Prix de Page (Auður Ava Ólafsdóttir). Contemporary Icelandic writers are published in an increased number in translations throughout the world.

Lifestyle

Nightlife

Alcohol is expensive at bars. People tend to drink at home before going out. Beer was banned in Iceland until 1 March 1989 but has since become popular among many Icelanders as their alcoholic drink of choice.

Live music
The Iceland Airwaves music festival is staged annually in November. This festival takes place all over the city, and the concert venue Harpa is one of the main locations. Other venues that frequently organise live music events are Kex, Húrra, Gaukurinn (grunge, metal, punk), Mengi (centre for contemporary music, avant-garde music and experimental music), the Icelandic Opera and the National Theatre of Iceland for classical music.

New Year's Eve
The arrival of the new year is a particular cause for celebration to the people of Reykjavík. Icelandic law states that anyone may purchase and use fireworks during a certain period around New Year's Eve. As a result, every New Year's Eve the city is lit up with fireworks displays.

Main sights

 Alþingishúsið – the Icelandic parliament building
 Austurvöllur – a park in central Reykjavík surrounded by restaurants and bars
 Árbæjarsafn (Reykjavík Open Air Museum) – Reykjavík's Municipal Museum
 CIA.IS – Center for Icelandic Art – general information on Icelandic visual art
 Hallgrímskirkja – the largest church in Iceland
 Harpa Reykjavík – Reykjavík Concert & Conference Center
 Heiðmörk – the largest forest and nature reserve in the area
 Höfði – the house in which Gorbachev and Reagan met in 1986 for the Iceland Summit
 Kringlan – the second-largest shopping mall in Iceland
 Laugardalslaug – swimming pool
 Laugavegur – main shopping street
 National and University Library of Iceland (Þjóðarbókhlaðan)
 National Museum of Iceland (Þjóðminjasafnið)
 Nauthólsvík – a geothermally-heated beach
 Perlan – a glass dome resting on six water tanks
 Reykjavík Town Hall – city hall
 Rauðhólar – a cluster of red pseudo- craters
 Reykjavík 871±2 – exhibition of an archaeological excavation of a Viking-age longhouse, from about AD 930
 Reykjavík Art Museum – the largest visual art institution in Iceland
 Reykjavík Botanic Garden
 Reykjavík Maritime Museum – a maritime museum located by the old harbour
 Safnahúsið, culture house, National Centre for Cultural Heritage (Þjóðmenningarhúsið)
 Tjörnin – a small lake in central Reykjavík
 University of Iceland

Recreation
Reykjavík Golf Club was established in 1934. It is the oldest and largest golf club in Iceland. It consists of two 18-hole courses—one at Grafarholt and the other at Korpa. The Grafarholt golf course opened in 1963, which makes it the oldest 18-hole golf course in Iceland. The Korpa golf course opened in 1997.

Education

Secondary schools
 Borgarholtsskóli (Borgó)
 Fjölbrautaskólinn í Breiðholti (FB)
 Fjölbrautaskólinn við Ármúla (FÁ)
 Kvennaskólinn í Reykjavík (Kvennó)
 Menntaskólinn Hraðbraut
 Menntaskólinn í Reykjavík (MR)
 Menntaskólinn við Hamrahlíð (MH)
 Menntaskólinn við Sund (MS)
 Tækniskólinn
 Verzlunarskóli Íslands (Verzló)

Universities
 Iceland Academy of the Arts
 Reykjavík University
 University of Iceland

International schools 
 International School of Iceland
 International Department at Landakotsskóli

Sports teams

Football

Úrvalsdeild
 Fram (Grafarholt og Úlfarsárdalur youth club)
 KR (Vesturbær youth club)
 Leiknir (Breiðholt youth club (Efra-Breiðholt))
 Valur (Hlíðar/Miðborg youth club)
 Víkingur (Háaleiti og Bústaðir youth club)

1. deild karla
 Fjölnir (Grafarvogur youth club)
 Fylkir (Árbær youth club)
 Kórdrengir 
 KV

Other youth clubs
Clubs classified as youth clubs offer youth teams where anyone can train with the team, though each club is based in a certain area of Reykjavík and mainly serves that area.
 ÍR (Breiðholt youth club (Neðra-Breiðholt/Seljahverfi))
 Þróttur (Laugardalur youth club)

Other

 Glímufélagið Ármann (sports club)
 Skautafélag Reykjavíkur (hockey)
 Skylmingafélag Reykjavíkur (fencing)

 Skotfélag Reykjavíkur (shooting)
 Íþróttafélag fatlaðra í Reykjavík (sports club for the disabled in Reykjavík)

Twin towns – sister cities

Reykjavík is twinned with:
 Moscow, Russia (2007)
 Seattle, United States (1986)
 Vilnius, Lithuania (2006)
 Winnipeg, Canada (1971)
 Wrocław, Poland (2017)

In July 2013, mayor Jón Gnarr filed a motion before the city council to terminate the city's relationship with Moscow, in response to a trend of anti-gay legislation in Russia.

Notable people

See also
 Althing
 Beer Day (Iceland)
 Kringlan
 Menningarnótt
 Rail transport in Iceland
 Reykjavík Green Days

Notes

References

Sources

External links

  

 
Populated places in Iceland
Municipalities of Iceland
Capitals in Europe
Populated coastal places in Iceland
Populated places established in 1786
Port cities in Europe
Viking Age populated places
1st-millennium establishments in Iceland